Messenger is a 2004 young adult dystopian novel by American author Lois Lowry, as is the third installment of The Giver Quartet, which began with the 1993 Newbery Medal-winning novel The Giver. The story takes place about eight years after the events of The Giver, and six years after the events of Gathering Blue, the preceding novel in the series. Characters from both of the previous books reappear in Messenger and give the novels a stronger continuity.

Set in an isolated community known simply as Village, the novel focuses on a boy, Matty, who serves as message-bearer through the ominous and lethal Forest that surrounds the community.

Plot
Matty, who was introduced in Gathering Blue as "Matt", now lives with Seer, who was originally named Christopher and is a blind man rescued by the people of the Village years earlier. 

Outside the safe boundaries of Village is the Forest, an unwelcoming realm that most of the Villagers fear because of its powerful harm. Despite the lack of dangerous beasts, The Forest is animated. 

People who trade at a gathering, Trade Mart, change from being compassionate and generous to angry and impatient. The Villagers change temperament and decide to close their borders and stop permitting the displaced and the unwanted of other communities to enter. Seer, in the wake of the sudden change, decides to send Matty to travel through the Forest to retrieve his daughter, Kira, who lives in a town several days away. 

The gift is a special ability that Matty possesses but hardly understands. It is a power of healing that causes wholeness from the inside out. Matty puts his hands to the ground and manages to restore the integrity of The Forest and people alike at the expense of his own life from the thickening forest. The Leader (Jonas) names Matty as "the Healer."

At the end of the novel, Matty's soul drifts deep into the earth, which saves the villagers and Forest. The chaos turns to peace, as Matty's powers become a part of the perishing earth.

Main characters 
 Matty has a special power. He can heal. Matty is first introduced as "Matt" in Gathering Blue.
 Seer is Christopher, a blind man first introduced in Gathering Blue.
 Kira is Seer's daughter and the main character of Gathering Blue.
 Leader is Jonas, the main character of The Giver.
 Mentor is the school teacher in Village. He trades away his disabilities, such as his birthmark, shortness etc. However, he becomes angrier and meaner, less trusting in order for these to go away. 
 Forest is a living representation of greed in Village that surrounds it.
 Trademaster is the leader of Trade Mart whose main lines of dialogue are the two questions: "Trade for what?" and "Trade away what?"

Reception
This book was nominated in the 2008 Young Hoosier Book Award.

References 

American young adult novels
Lois Lowry Giver series
2004 American novels
Houghton Mifflin books